Lalo (Western Yi) is a Loloish language cluster spoken in western Yunnan, China by 300,000 speakers. Speakers are officially part of the Yi nationality, and Chinese linguists refer to it as "Western Yi" due to its distribution in western Yunnan. Lalo speakers are mostly located in southern Dali Prefecture, especially Weishan County, considered the traditional homeland of the Lalo. Historically, this area is the home of the Meng clan, who ruled the Nanzhao Kingdom (737–902 CE). Many speakers of Core Lalo dialects claim to be descendants of the Meng clan.

Names
Many Lalo are referred to by the exonym Menghua (蒙化), a name used during the Yuan Dynasty to refer to an area comprising modern-day Weishan County and Nanjian County (Yang 2010:12). They are also referred to as Tujia (土家) people (Yunnan 1956:14-15).

David Bradley (2007) refers to the Lalo language cluster, which includes the Samatu language of Zhenkang County and Yongde County, as Laloid.

Demographics
Cathryn Yang (2010) gives the following demographic information for various Lalo languages. Combined, speakers of Lalo languages number fewer than 300,000 people.

Central Lalo: 213,000 speakers across west-central Yunnan in Weishan County, Nanjian County, Jingdong County, and several others
West Lalo: 44,000 speakers Yongping County, Yangbi County, and Longyang County
East Lalo: 15,000 speakers in Dali County
Yangliu: 7,000 speakers in Yangliu, Longyang District, Baoshan Prefecture
Eka: 3,000 speakers in Yijiacun, Heliu, Shuangjiang County, Lincang Prefecture
Mangdi: 3,000 speakers in Mangdi, Hepai, Gengma County, Lincang Prefecture; also in Cangyuan County
Xuzhang: 2,000 speakers in Xuzhang, Wafang, Longyang District, Baoshan Prefecture

Wang & Zhao (2013), citing Chen, et al. (1985), divide Western Yi (彝语西部方言) into two dialects, namely Dongshan and Xishan.
Dongshan 东山: spoken in Weishan (eastern part), Dali, Midu (in Dajiaban 大甲板 and Xiaojiaban 小甲板), Yongping, Baoshan counties
Xishan 西山: spoken in Weishan (western part), Dali, Yun, Changning, Lincang, Shuangjiang, Midu, Jingdong, Jinggu counties

In Jianxing Township 建兴乡, Xinping County, Yunnan, Lalu 腊鲁 is spoken in the two administrative villages of Malutang 马鹿塘 and Mowei 磨味 by about 3,000 people (Wang 2011:11,20).
Malutang 马鹿塘 (1,552 Lalu people): in the 11 villages of Goutoupo 狗头坡, Gaoyingzhai 高阴寨, Cizhujing 刺竹警, Upper Mazongshan 上马宗山, Lower Mazongshan 下马宗山, Daliqi 大力气, Yuwuxiang 玉武乡, Upper Mowei 上磨味, Lower Mowei 下磨味, Upper Yunpan 上云盘, Lower Yunpan 下云盘
Mowei 磨味 (1,460 Lalu people): in the 6 villages of Malu Dazu 马鹿大组, Lalu Xiaozhai 腊鲁小寨, Laojing 老警, Xinzhai 新寨, Tianfang 田房, and Meizijing 梅子警.

Lalu 腊鲁 (exonyms: Xiangtang 香堂 and Luoluo 罗罗) is also spoken in Sipsongpanna, including in Xiangmeng 象明乡, Yiwu 易武乡, Mengpeng 勐捧镇, and Jinghong 景洪市 townships.

Yunnan (1979) mentions the Datou 达头 of Pu'er and Simao (population: 254 as of 1960) as having traditions and festivals similar to those of the Yi people of Weishan County, who are mostly Lalo speakers.

The Aciga 阿次嘎 of Lancang County reside in Yakou Township 雅口乡 and Nanxian Township 南现乡 (now Nuozhadu Town 糯扎渡镇). They numbered 50 as of 1960. 100 years ago, they had migrated from Niujian Mountain 牛肩山, Zhenyue County 镇越县 (now renamed as Mengla County), and had spoken a different language that is now extinct. They now speak Chinese and "Yi" (presumably Lalo, as the Yi dialects of Lancang are mostly Lalo). Aciga is an exonym, as the Aciga do not have an autonym.

Subdivisions
Lama (2012) splits Laluba into three dialects.
Laluba
Misaba
(branch)
Laloba
Laluba

A recent dialectological survey by Cathryn Yang (2010) shows that the Lalo cluster comprises at least 7 closely related languages. Three of these (Eastern, Western, and Central) constitute the Core Lalo group and are located in the traditional Lalo homeland of southern Dali Prefecture. There are also four peripheral languages, Mangdi, Eka, Yangliu, and Xuzhang, whose ancestors migrated out of the Lalo homeland at different times.

All Lalo languages show a reflex of the Proto-Lalo autonym *la2lo̠Hpa̠L; i.e. the name that the Proto-Lalo called themselves are still preserved in the various modern Lalo languages.

Yang's (2010:209) phylogenetic tree of Lalo is as follows.

Proto-Lalo
Eka
Mangdi 芒底
Yangliu 杨柳
Greater Lalo
Xuzhang 徐掌
Core Lalo
Eastern
Taoshu 桃树
Core Eastern
Central-Western
Central
East Mountain
Core Central
Western
Yilu 义路
Core Western

Alu may also be a peripheral Lalo language, but this is uncertain due to limited data.

Phonology

Consonants 

  are heard as alveolo-palatal  before front vowels .
  is always heard as labio-dental  before front vowels . In the Western dialects,  is phonemically distinct.
  is always heard as a voiced glottal sound  before vowels . In the Western dialects,  is heard as  before ,  before , and  before vowels .
 Nasals  are heard as palatal  before a close vowel .
 Nasals  can have syllabic allophones of  when preceding other consonants.
 The glottalized  is heard as a glottalized retroflex sound  before a central close  vowel.
 Syllables with no initial consonant, always phonetically begin with a glottal stop .

Vowels 

Vowels  do not occur in syllables with harsh phonation.
 The close rounded vowel  mainly occurs after velar initials.
 The close central vowel  is heard as rounded  when after bilabial consonants , as syllabic  after alveolar sounds  and as a syllabic retroflex  after retroflex sounds .  also only occurs after bilabial, retroflex and velar initial consonants and never after alveolar stops, labio-dental or labio-velar initials.
 Mid-central vowel  is realized as a syllabic labiodental fricative , when after labio-dental fricatives.  never occurs after labial consonants or alveolar affricates or fricatives.

 Close central vowel  is heard as an apical syllabic sound  after alveolar affricates and fricatives and as  after retroflex affricates and fricatives.

 Open back vowel  is typically realized as a central  and is then raised after retroflex sounds as a mid sound .

 A syllabic fricative  is contrastive with back vowels . It only occurs after labio-dental consonants .

Tones 
The following are the tones in Central and Western Lalo:

See also
List of Proto-Lalo reconstructions (Wiktionary)

Further reading
Yang, Cathryn. (2019). CLDF dataset derived from Yang's "Lalo Regional Varieties" from 2011 [Data set]. Zenodo.

References

Loloish languages